The 2004 Buffalo Funds - NAIA Men's Division I  Basketball Tournament was held in March at Municipal Auditorium in Kansas City, Missouri. This was the 67th annual NAIA DI basketball tournament and featured 32 teams playing in a single-elimination format. This was the third year the tournament was held in Kansas City. The 2004 NAIA national championship game featured the #1 ranked Cougars of Mountain State and the #6 ranked Eagles of Concordia University (CA). This match up was a repeat of the 2003 tournament. The Cougars defeated the Eagles 74–70. The other teams that rounded out the NAIA national semifinals were Georgetown College (KY) and University of Mobile, respectively.

Awards and honors
Leading scorer: Zach Moss, Mountain State – in 5 games, Moss scored a total of 138 points, including 54 field goals and 30 free throws, averaging 27.6 points per game
Leading rebounder: Nick VanderLaan, Concordia (CA) – in 5 games, VanderLaan recorded 71 rebounds at 14.2 per game
Most consecutive tournament appearances: 13 – Georgetown (KY)
Most tournament appearances: Georgetown (KY) – 23rd of 28 appearances in the NAIA Tournament

2004 NAIA bracket

  * denotes overtime.

See also
2004 NAIA Division I women's basketball tournament
2004 NCAA Division I men's basketball tournament
2004 NCAA Division II men's basketball tournament
2004 NCAA Division III men's basketball tournament
2004 NAIA Division II men's basketball tournament

References

NAIA Men's Basketball Championship
Tournament
NAIA Division I men's basketball tournament
NAIA Division I men's basketball tournament